Post-amendment to the Tamil Nadu Entertainments Tax Act 1939 on 1 April 1958, Gross jumped to 140 per cent of Nett  Commercial Taxes Department disclosed 61 crore in entertainment tax revenue for the year.

The following is a list of films produced in the Tamil film industry in India in 1987, in alphabetical order.

References 

1987
Films, Tamil
Lists of 1987 films by country or language
1980s Tamil-language films